Birtin may refer to several villages in Romania:

 Birtin, a village in Vadu Crișului Commune, Bihor County
 Birtin, a village in Vața de Jos Commune, Hunedoara County